The Halfway House is a 1944 British drama film directed by Basil Dearden and starring Mervyn Johns, his daughter Glynis Johns, Tom Walls and Françoise Rosay. The film tells the story of ten people who are drawn to stay in an old Welsh countryside inn. Location scenes were shot at Barlynch Priory on the Devon/Somerset border.

BFI Screenonline writes, "The high-quality personnel involved and the tight, professional scripting mark the film out as one of the earliest templates of what would become the traditional Ealing style."

Plot
During the Second World War, various people converge on the Halfway House, an inn in the Welsh countryside. In flashback, we see the events which have led them there. In Cardiff, David Davies, a famous orchestra conductor, is advised by his doctor to cancel a tour and rest, or he will live for only about three months. In London, Richard and Jill French argue about the education of their young daughter Joanna, who overhears them agree to divorce; then Mr. French and Joanna go on vacation. Captain Fortescue is released from Parkmoor Prison; he had been court-martialled for stealing the regimental funds. In a Welsh port, merchant captain Harry Meadows and his French wife Alice quarrel about their deceased son, a victim of the U-boats. Black marketeer Oakley departs from London for some fishing, while Margaret and her Irish diplomat fiancé Terence take a train from Bristol.

Oakley and Fortescue meet on the road; it turns out they know each other. Though Fortescue had scanned the countryside thoroughly with his binoculars in vain for the Halfway House, it mysteriously appears. When they reach it, the proprietor Rhys also seems to materialise out of thin air. He tells a puzzled Fortescue he was expected. When Oakley signs the register, he notices a long gap after the last signature, dated 1942, it being 21 June 1943. (The newspapers are a year old.)

Others arrive; the Meadows request separate rooms. Rhys serves a grieving Alice tea in her room. She is shocked to see no reflection of Rhys in the mirror when he leaves. Mr. French notices his wife's handwriting in the register and suspects that Joanna arranged for them to stay in the same place. Later, Fortescue is sitting outside when he notices that Gwyneth, Rhys's daughter, casts no shadow, though Joanna, standing nearby, does. Joanna arranges a fake near-drowning, with the help of Captain Meadows, to try to reunite her parents; it nearly goes awry. Margaret and Terence quarrel when he is eager to accept a posting in Berlin (Ireland being neutral).

At dinner, Rhys relates how the inn was bombed by an aeroplane exactly a year ago and burnt down. While helping Gwyneth wash the dishes afterwards, she tells Davies "you're coming our way". He understands. Alice arranges a seance, much to her husband's disapproval. The table moves but the captain turns on the radio, breaking the mood. After Alice storms out, he explains to the others that he wants his son to be allowed to rest in peace. Rhys suggests he tell his wife; he does and the couple reconcile. Radio broadcasts from 1942 convince everyone that somehow they have gone back in time one year. Rhys explains that they all needed a pause to consider their lives. The air raid proceeds as Rhys described. Richard French's paramount concern for his wife and daughter's safety and Terence's newfound hatred of the Germans reunite them with the women in their lives, while both Fortescue and Oakley repent their criminal ways. The guests leave behind a demolished inn.

Cast

Reception
The film premiered in London at the Regal, Marble Arch on 14 April 1944, and The Times reviewer wrote: "The film elusively obtains its effects when it appears to be least striving after them, and an occasional frisson is achieved by acute touches of direction which light up not only depths of human tension and unhappiness, but also unobtrusively reckon with their cause—the war."

George Perry wrote in Forever Ealing (1981), "No matter how well-acted, the fantasy is hard to sustain and never develops beyond a theatrical morality tale." The Huffington Post reviewer disagreed, writing "I really can't recommend The Halfway House enough: unlike the more overt Ealing war films (which this resembles in many ways, not least the disparate group coming together and working together), this is subtler propaganda, and its overarching supernatural atmosphere is well done. Apart from that, however, it offers strong character portraits, great visual flourishes, and another solid turn from [Mervyn] Johns." Flickering Myth called it "an unseen and unappreciated classic of British cinema".

References

External links
 
 
Review of film at Variety

1944 films
1940s fantasy drama films
British black-and-white films
British fantasy drama films
British war drama films
Ealing Studios films
Films set in 1942
Films set in 1943
Films directed by Basil Dearden
Films produced by Michael Balcon
Films set in Wales
Films set in London
Films about time travel
British World War II films
World War II films made in wartime
1940s war drama films
1944 drama films
1944 war films
1940s English-language films
1940s British films